Emmanuel Kembe is a South Sudanese reggae musician.

Biography 
Emmanuel Mark Kembe was born January 9, 1969, in Wau, Western Bahr el-Ghazal, New Sudan the now Republic of South Sudan.

Kembe lived in exile since 1994–2005 and has been recognized in the stream media due to his songs beginning with Shen Shen his first album.

Music career 
Born a singer songwriter singing mostly in English, his Pop-Reggae features, musician through his inspirational reggae music, Kembe has gained fame through the various works he has done by his music career. He founded Kembe Music International in 2010.

Contributions 
Kembe has performed songs about patriotism, peace and the reconstruction of the country  and as a peace activist, he has majored in the cultural as well as diverse issues affecting the Country of South Sudan. He has performed in various concerts such as that organized by United Nations. He has carried out peace concerts aimed at bringing people together in the small country like South Sudan. Comedy for Peace organized by UNMISS had him perform in order to build connections and unity.

References 

Living people
Year of birth missing (living people)
South Sudanese musicians
1969 births
People from Western Bahr el Ghazal